John May (born 26 September 1849 in Southampton, Hampshire; date of death unknown) was an English cricketer. May was a right-handed batsman who was a right-arm fast bowler.

May made his first-class debut for Hampshire in 1867 against Kent. May played two matches for Hampshire in the 1867 season, both against Kent.

In 1870 May played two first-class matches, both of which came against Lancashire, with his second match against Lancashire representing his final first-class match.

A bowler, May took six wickets at a bowling average of 27.50, with best figures of 4/80.

May's date of death is unknown.

External links
John May at Cricinfo
John May at CricketArchive

1849 births
Cricketers from Southampton
English cricketers
Hampshire cricketers
Year of death missing